The Club: Johnson, Boswell, and the Friends Who Shaped an Age is a 2019 book by Leo Damrosch that examines The Club. The book has three "positive" reviews, seven "rave" reviews, and one "mixed" review, according to review aggregator Book Marks.

References

2019 non-fiction books
English-language books
Yale University Press books
The Club (dining club)